Tim Seldin (born June 16, 1946) is an author, educator and the President of The Montessori Foundation and Chair of The International Montessori Council. His more than forty years of experience in Montessori education includes twenty-two years as Headmaster of the Barrie School in Silver Spring, Maryland, which he attended through high school graduation. He served as the Director of the Institute for Advanced Montessori Studies and as Headmaster and currently as Executive Director of the New Gate School in Sarasota, Florida. He is the author of several books including How To Raise An Amazing Child the Montessori Way, “The World In The Palm of Her Hand”, “The Montessori Way” with Dr. Paul Epstein, “Montessori 101”, and “Montessori For Every Family” with Lorna McGrath. Tim conducts weekly webinars about Montessori Education.

Personal life
Seldin is married to Joyce St. Giermaine.

Bibliography
 The Montessori Way, (Montessori Foundation, 2003), with Dr. Paul Epstein. 
 How To Raise An Amazing Child the Montessori Way (DK, 2006) 
 2nd edition (DK, 2017) 
 Cómo educar niños maravillosos con el método Montessori (Kaleidoscopio) (Spanish Edition) (Spanish) 1st Edition
Publisher: Gaia Ediciones; 1 edition (October 13, 2016) Language: Spanish.  by Tim Seldin  (Author), Blanca González Villegas (Translator)
 Come crescere un bambino eccezionale con il metodo Montessori (Italian) Paperback – March 15, 2018, 
by Tim Seldin (Author), Publisher: Xenia (March 15, 2018), 
 ElternWissen. Kinder fördern nach Montessori (German) Paperback – September 24, 2015, Publisher: Dorling Kindersley Verlag (September 24, 2015), 
 The World in the Palm of Her Hand (co-authored by Donna Seldin Danner) 
 Finding the Perfect Match – Recruit and Retain Your Ideal Enrollment
 Master Teachers/Model Programs. (Montessori Foundation, 2003 with Jonathan Wolff)
 Starting a New Montessori School
 Building a World-Class Montessori School (co-authored by Jonathan Wolff)
 Celebrations of Life (co-authored by Musya Meyer) 
 The Montessori Approach to Geography and History for the Young Child, With Donna Raymond, Publisher: Brigham Young Univ Pr (May 1, 1985), Language: English

References

External links
 

1946 births
Living people
Montessori education